The Wedding March is an American-Canadian made for television romantic comedy film series starring Jack Wagner and Josie Bissett. Written by Neal H. Dobrofsky and Tippi Dobrofsky, the films were originally broadcast on the Hallmark Channel from 2016 to 2021.

Cast 
 Jack Wagner as Mick Turner, a has-been singer and widower who owns the Willow Lake Inn in Vermont
 Josie Bissett as Olivia "Livvy" Phillips-Pershing, Mick's college girlfriend and single mother
 Emily Tennant as Grace Pershing, Olivia's daughter
 Aaron Pearl as Duke, an old friend of Mick and Olivia's who is also the head chef at the Inn
 Sarah Grey as Julie Turner, Mick's daughter
 Mitch Ainley as Wyatt, Julie's boyfriend
 Susan Hogan as Nora Phillips, Olivia's mother
 Serge Houde as Johnny, Nora's boyfriend

Characters summary 
 A dark grey cell indicates the character was not in the film.

Films

Production

Development 
Following the success of its first "June Weddings" event in 2015 Hallmark announced that the event would return in 2016, with The Wedding March  as one of the channel's line-up of original television movies.

The film saw stars Jack Wagner and Josie Bissett reunite after having both previously starred in the 1990s Fox television series Melrose Place. Wagner was also involved in the development of the film and served as an executive producer on the production.

Wagner's character teaches a choir and he also recorded music for the film.

Filming 
Filming took place in Vancouver and British Columbia in April and May 2016. The second installment was also shot in Vancouver. The third installment in the franchise, entitled The Wedding March 3: Here Comes the Bride was filmed in British Columbia in May 2017, again starring Wagner and Bissett.

Broadcast 
The first film in the series aired on June 25, 2016 as part of the channel's second annual "June Weddings" event on Hallmark Channel.

Reception 
The first installment of the film garnered 2.3 million viewers on its premiere and was the top-rated cable network program of the day. On Twitter it became the number one Tweeted cable/broadcast television film of the week.

References

External links 
 
 

2016 television films
2010s romantic comedy films
Canadian television films

Films about weddings
Hallmark Channel original films
Films shot in British Columbia
2010s Canadian films
Canadian film series